The 1993 Cork Junior A Hurling Championship was the 96th staging of the Cork Junior A Hurling Championship since its establishment by the Cork County Board. The draw for the opening fixtures took place on 13 December 1992. The championship ran from 26 September to 31 October 1993.

The final was played on 31 October 1993 at Páirc Uí Chaoimh in Cork between Blarney and Kilworth, in what was their first ever meeting in the final. Blarney won the match by 2-10 to 1-09 to claim their second championship title overall and a first title in 57 years.

Kilworth's Pat Greehy was the championship's top scorer with 2-13.

Qualification

Results

Quarter-finals

 Glen Rovers received a bye in this round.

Semi-finals

Final

Championship statistics

Top scorers

Overall

In a single game

References

1993 in hurling
Cork Junior Hurling Championship